Johan Egbert Frederik "Frits" de Kok (6 January 1882, in Maastricht – 28 October 1940, in The Hague) was the General Managing Director of the Royal Dutch Petroleum Company from 1937 to October 1940. This was the most senior executive position in the company and due to the structure of Royal Dutch Shell at the time was, with the Chairman of the Shell Transport and Trading Company, the joint senior executive position in the Royal Dutch Shell group.

References

1882 births
1940 deaths
20th-century Dutch businesspeople
Chief Executive Officers of Shell plc
Delft University of Technology alumni
Knights of the Order of the Netherlands Lion
Officers of the Order of the Crown (Belgium)
People from Maastricht